The 1986 Copa del Rey Final was the 84th final of the King's Cup. The final was played at Vicente Calderón Stadium in Madrid, on 26 April 1986, and was won by Zaragoza, who beat Barcelona 1–0.

Details

References

1988
Copa
FC Barcelona matches
Real Zaragoza matches